Cot-1, COT-1, cot-1, or cot−1 may refer to:

 Cot-1 DNA, used in comparative genomic hybridization
 cot−1y = cot−1(y), sometimes interpreted as arccot(y) or arccotangent of y, the compositional inverse of the trigonometric function cotangent (see below for ambiguity)
 cot−1x = cot−1(x), sometimes interpreted as (cot(x))−1 =  = tan(x) or tangent of x, the multiplicative inverse (or reciprocal) of the trigonometric function cotangent (see above for ambiguity)
 cot x−1, sometimes interpreted as cot(x−1) = cot(), the cotangent of the multiplicative inverse (or reciprocal) of x (see below for ambiguity)
 cot x−1, sometimes interpreted as (cot(x))−1 =  = tan(x) or tangent of x, the multiplicative inverse (or reciprocal) of the trigonometric function cotangent (see above for ambiguity)

See also
Inverse function
tan−1 (disambiguation)